West Side Story is a jazz album by pianist André Previn and his trio. Previn, along with drummer Shelly Manne and bassist Red Mitchell, chose eight compositions from the original score of the Leonard Bernstein musical West Side Story and re-arranged them in a jazz style.

Track listing
Original music by Leonard Bernstein
 "Something's Coming" - 2:37
 "Jet Song" - 4:48
 "Tonight" - 5:24
 "I Feel Pretty" - 6:47
 "Gee, Officer Krupke!" - 4:55
 "Cool" - 3:21
 "Maria" - 5:30
 "America" - 4:51

Personnel
André Previn & His Pals
André Previn - piano
Shelly Manne - drums
Red Mitchell - double-bass

References

1959 albums
André Previn albums
Contemporary Records albums
Grammy Award for Best Jazz Instrumental Album